Margo Hebald (Heymann) is an American architect. Formally based in Santa Monica, California, she specialized in commercial work, transportation, and healthcare facilities.

Life and education
She is the daughter of the late world renown sculptor, Milton Hebald. She graduated Cornell University College of Architecture, Art, and Planning and attended the Universitá d'Architetura, Sapienza, Rome, Italy. She was one of five women in the freshman class of 64 students, in the class of 1963.

Work
She was associate architect for Terminal One at LAX Los Angeles International Airport. She was architect and interior designer for children's dental clinics in Oxnard, Camarillo and Simi Valley in California (published). She was design consultant architect with the Luckman Partnerships in the plans for the metro rail station in Universal City, California.

Notable projects
Terminal One, Los Angeles International Airport, Los Angeles, California 
Union Station/Metro Rail, Los Angeles, California. Consultant to Harry Weese.
Simi Valley Hospital, Simi Valley, California 
Northridge Hospital Medical Center and Gift Shop and chapel, Northridge, California 
University of California-Los Angeles Medical Center, Los Angeles, California (Head Neck Clinic;Marion Davies Pediatric Clinic; Orthopedic Center; Ninth and Tenth Floors)
Community Hospital of Sacramento, Sacramento, California 
S.E. Rykoff Offices, Los Angeles, California 
Suite for Doctors Doberne and Brooks, Simi Valley, California 
Universal City Metro Rail Station, Los Angeles, California 
Cantor Dental Suite, Simi Valley, California 
Lisagor Dental Suite, Camarillo, California
Marion Davies Children's Clinic, University of California-Los Angeles, Los Angeles, California 
Oxnard Children's Dental Group, Oxnard, California 
Westlake Plaza Medical Building, Thousand Oaks, California 
Santa Monica Mall Building, Santa Monica, California  
Bellflower City Hospital, Bellflower, California 
Olive View Medical Center, Sylmar, California 
Suite for Doctors Nathanson and Turnier, Northridge, California 
Veterans Administration Hospital, Brentwood, California
Orthopedic Surgery Medical Group, Los Angeles, California 
Bank of America California State, Los Angeles, California

References

Cornell University College of Architecture, Art, and Planning alumni
20th-century American architects
Living people
American women architects
Year of birth missing (living people)
20th-century American women
21st-century American women